Stephen or Steve Sullivan may refer to:

 Stephen Sullivan (American football) (born 1996), American football tight end
 Stephen D. Sullivan (born 1959), American author
 Steve Sullivan (born 1974), Canadian ice hockey player
 Steve Sullivan (basketball) (1944–2014), American basketball player
 Steve Sullivan (boxer) (1897–1979), American boxer